The Abbotsford School District is a public school district in Clark and Marathon counties, Wisconsin, United States, based in Abbotsford, Wisconsin.
(Note: there is also an Abbotsford School District in Abbotsford, British Columbia, Canada.) School District 34 Abbotsford

Schools
The Abbotsford School District has one elementary school, one middle/senior high school and one alternative high school & education center.

Elementary school
 Abbotsford Elementary School

Middle/senior high school
 Abbotsford Middle/Senior High School

Alternative high school & education center
 Falcon Enterprises Alternative High School & Education Center

References

External links
 

School districts in Wisconsin
Education in Clark County, Wisconsin
Education in Marathon County, Wisconsin